Kalathilpady (also spelt as Kalathilpadi or Kalathipady) is a wealthy suburb of Kottayam city in the state of Kerala in south India. Kalathilpady got its name from Kalathil Family. It is about 4 km from the city center located on the Kottayam Kumily (KK) road. 

It is known for the three best schools of Kottayam, Marian Senior Secondary school, Pallikoodam (formerly called Corpus Christi High School) and Girideepam. The priests of the Order of the Imitation of Christ (OIC) run Girideepam. Kalathilpady is situated close to the town of Kanjikuzhy and is well connected by bus and taxis. It has a lot of shops and markets which are meant for luxurious as well as simple daily-life.

External links
 Official website of Kottayam District
 Official website from Gov. of Kerala

Suburbs of Kottayam